The Rendez-Vous of Déjà-Vu (original title: La Fille du 14 juillet) is a 2013 French comedy film directed by Antonin Peretjatko.

Plot 
Hector tries to seduce during a short summer Truquette, since the government decided to reduce the vacation to one month due to the economic crisis.

Cast 
 Vimala Pons as Truquette
 Grégoire Tachnakian as Hector
 Vincent Macaigne as Pator
 Marie-Lorna Vaconsin as Charlotte
 Thomas Schmitt as Bertier
 Serge Trinquecoste as Doctor Placenta
 Claude Sanchez as Madame Placenta
 Esteban as Julot
 Philippe Gouin as Marcello
 Lucie Borleteau as Gretchen
 Thomas Ruat as Ernest
 Thomas Vernant as Funest
 Pierre Méréjkowsky as Chamboule-Tout
 Nicolas Moreau as "the Lion"
 Bruno Podalydès as the commissioner

Accolades

References

External links 

2013 films
2010s comedy road movies
French comedy road movies
2013 comedy films
2010s French films